Rise Up is the debut album by Swiss DJ Yves Larock, released on September 26, 2008.

Track listing

Charts

Release history

References

2008 debut albums
Yves Larock albums